The Wirangu are an Aboriginal Australian people of the Western coastal region of South Australia.

Name
Daisy Bates stated that the Wirangu ethnonym was composed of two words: wira (cloud) and wonga (speech).

Language
Wirangu is usually classified as genetically related to the Thura-Yura language family. Early ethnographers, such as R. H. Mathews stated that the Barngarla, Nauo and Wirangu peoples were "practically the same people in language and customs".

Country

Mythology

In ancestral times a large mother snake travelled down from the west to Juldi'kapi. From there it was followed by two men (the Wati Kutjara) who wished to kill it. They chased the snake south-east to Pedinga water-hole (Pedinga'kapi, thirty-five miles south-east of the Ooldea Soak). This granite water-hole was the snake's camp. The natural basin-shaped depressions in the rock, averaging three feet in diameter, are said to be the nests of snakes. Here the Wati Kutjara speared the snake, wounding it severely. They left it thus, thinking that it would soon die, and returned to the west. The snake, however, managed to crawl on a little distance (about two miles) to the south to an ochre pan, named Mul'tan'tu. Here she rested, leaving the red, yellow and white ochre deposits found there. The red ochre symbolizes the blood shed by the snake, the white ochre the excreta; while the yellow ochre is the urine. The snake left this clay-pan and continued on to the north-east and then westwards to her camp.

History of contact
Already on the eve of contact with whites, the Wirangu were being pressured out of part of their traditional territory by the movements of the Kokata.

Alternative names

 Hilleri (Barngarla Kuyani exonym)
 Jilbara (Kokata exonym, meaning "southerners")
 Naljara (Kokata exonym)
 Ngoleiadjara (Yankuntjatjarra exonym)
 Nonga (denoting "man")
 Tidni, Tidnie, Titnie. (Barngarla Kuyani exonym)
 Wanbiri (Kokata exonym, meaning (people of the) "sea coast")
 Wangon (language name, bearing pejorative sense of "shit" (kona))
 Willeuroo (Barngarla exonym, wilyaru meaning "west")
 Windakan (term used also to denote the Ngalia language)
 Wirrongu
 Wirrung
 Wirrunga, Wirangga
 Yilrea (variant of Hilleri)

Source:

Notes

Citations

Sources

Further reading 
Native title determination, 9 December 2022

Aboriginal peoples of South Australia